Askanian is a breed of domesticated sheep found in Ukraine. It is a fine-wool breed bred for its wool. It was developed by crossing American Rambouillet with Merinos in the early 1900s.

Characteristics
Both sexes display white and are unicolored. Rams are horned and ewes can be either horned or polled (hornless). On average and at maturity, rams weigh . In 1980, there were over 1.6 million.

References

Sheep breeds originating in Ukraine